Mihály Lombard de Szentábrahám (Városfalva, 1683 – Kolozsvár, March 30, 1758) was a Hungarian Unitarian bishop. He re-laid the foundations of the Unitarian Church in Transylvania during a period of harassment until the accession of Joseph II and the return of an era of tolerance.

During the period 1718-1720 the settlements were struck by famine and plague. He was preacher for the unitarian members at the Nagyszeben Committee. Here he got acquainted with Sámuel Homoródszentmártoni Bíró who initiated and funded his foreign trips from the spring of 1712. On 1 May 1713 he was the student of Leiden University. Later, from the 5th of November, 1714 he was enrolled at Odera-Frankfurt University learning philosophy and theology. He returned home on the 18th of August, 1715. First he was the tutor of the sons of Sámuel Homoródszentmártoni Bíró, later from the 27th of February the professor of the Kolozsvári Unitarian School. In 1720 he became director of the John Sigismund Unitarian Academy, at the time when the great-great grandson of Fausto Sozzini, Andrzej Wiszowaty Jr. was a teacher there.

Works
 Summa Universae Theologiae Christianae secundum Unitarios published posthumously 1782

References

See portrait at Hungarian Wikipedia article

Hungarian Unitarians
1683 births
1758 deaths
Unitarian Church of Transylvania
People from Harghita County
18th-century Hungarian people
18th-century Unitarian clergy
18th-century bishops
Heads of educational institutions
History of Christianity in Romania